100% NL TV is a non-stop music television channel that airs mainly music videos of Dutch artists. The channel launched through cable operator Ziggo on 1 October 2013. It is a collaboration between radio station 100% NL and music channel Lite TV. The channel broadcasts 24 hours a day. It airs across the Netherlands.

See also
 100% NL

References

External links 
 Official Website

Television channels in the Netherlands
Television channels and stations established in 2013
Mass media in Naarden